De Lalande is a multiring impact crater on Venus. The crater has an outer rim but no peak and is in close proximity to the volcano Gula Mons.

Namesake

The de Lalande crater is named after the French astronomer Marie-Jeanne de Lalande (1768-1832), illegitimate daughter of astronomer Joseph Jerome de Lalande (1732-1807).

References

Impact craters on Venus